is a Japanese footballer who plays as a defender for J2 League club Blaublitz Akita.

Career statistics

Club
.

Notes

References

External links

1996 births
Living people
Sportspeople from Osaka Prefecture
Association football people from Osaka Prefecture
Doshisha University alumni
Japanese footballers
Association football defenders
J3 League players
J2 League players
AC Nagano Parceiro players
Blaublitz Akita players